Perryville Regional Airport  (also known as McBride Airport / Perryville Municipal Airport) is a city-owned public-use airport located nine nautical miles (17 km) north of the central business district of Perryville, a city in Perry County, Missouri, United States.

Facilities and aircraft 
It has one runway designated 2/20 with a concrete surface measuring 7,003 by 100 feet (2,135 x 30 m).

For the 12-month period ending June 30, 2011, the airport had 5,900 total aircraft operations, an average of 16 per day: 86% general aviation, 8% military and 5% air taxi. At that time there were nine aircraft based at this airport: eight single-engine and one helicopter.

History
The airport was built in 1942 by the United States Army Air Forces as a primary (stage 1) pilot training airfield assigned to AAF Flying Training Command, Southeast Training Center (later Eastern Flying Training Command).  It was named Chester Army Airfield and consisted of two parallel 2000' runways aligned NNE/SSW (02/20).

Flight training was provided by Anderson Air Activities to the aviation cadets assigned to the airfield and Fairchild PT-19s were the primary trainer used.  Pilot training at the airfield apparently ended on 30 May 1944, with the drawdown of AAFTC's pilot training program. The airfield was turned over to civil control at the end of the war though the War Assets Administration (WAA).

The name of Perryville Regional Airport and ICAO codes were changed from Perryville Municipal Airport and K02 on March 2, 2017.

See also

 Missouri World War II Army Airfields
 29th Flying Training Wing (World War II)

References 

 Manning, Thomas A. (2005), History of Air Education and Training Command, 1942–2002.  Office of History and Research, Headquarters, AETC, Randolph AFB, Texas 
 Shaw, Frederick J. (2004), Locating Air Force Base Sites, History’s Legacy, Air Force History and Museums Program, United States Air Force, Washington DC.

External links 
 City of Perryville, Airport Division
 Aerial photo from USGS The National Map via MSR Maps, 10 April 1996
 
 

1942 establishments in Missouri
Airports established in 1942
Airports in Missouri
Buildings and structures in Perry County, Missouri
Airfields of the United States Army Air Forces in Missouri
USAAF Contract Flying School Airfields